The women's 49 kg competition of the taekwondo events at the 2019 Pan American Games took place on July 27 at the Polideportivo Callao.

Results

Main bracket
The final results were:
{{16TeamBracket|compact=y|seeds=n|byes=1
|RD1=Preliminary round
|RD2=Quarterfinals
|RD3=Semifinals
|RD4=Gold medal match
|team-width=210

|RD1-team03=
|RD1-score03=11
|RD1-team04=
|RD1-score04=7

|RD1-team05=
|RD1-score05=25
|RD1-team06=
|RD1-score06=11

|RD1-team07=
|RD1-score07=8
|RD1-team08=
|RD1-score08=11

|RD1-team11=
|RD1-score11=10
|RD1-team12=
|RD1-score12=10

|RD1-team13=
|RD1-score13=8
|RD1-team14=
|RD1-score14=7

|RD2-team01=
|RD2-score01=7
|RD2-team02=
|RD2-score02=20

|RD2-team03=
|RD2-score03=9
|RD2-team04=
|RD2-score04=0

|RD2-team05=
|RD2-score05=6
|RD2-team06=
|RD2-score06=1

|RD2-team07=
|RD2-score07=21
|RD2-team08={{flagPASOathlete|Talisca Reis|BRA|2019}}
|RD2-score08=29

|RD3-team01=
|RD3-score01=3
|RD3-team02={{flagPASOathlete|Daniela Souza|MEX|2019}}
|RD3-score02=14

|RD3-team03=
|RD3-score03=0
|RD3-team04=

Repechage

References

External links
  Results brackets

Taekwondo at the 2019 Pan American Games
2019 in women's taekwondo